The 2007–08 Israeli Women's Cup (Gvia HaMedina Nashim) was the 10th season of Israel's women's nationwide football cup competition.

The competition was won, for the 6th consecutive time, by Maccabi Holon who had beaten ASA Tel Aviv University 4–3 on penalties after 1–1  in the final.

Results

First round

Quarter-finals

Semi-finals

Final

References
2007–08 State Cup Women Israeli Football Association 

Israel Women's Cup seasons
cup
Israel